Epidendrum nocturnum (the "nocturnal epidendrum") is the type species of the genus Epidendrum of the Orchidaceae (Orchid family).
The species occurs in Florida, Bahamas, West Indies, Belize, Central America to northern Brazil and the Guyanas. Epidendrum nocturnum is common in South Florida.

It is usually autogamous (flowers self-pollinate) and sometimes cleistogamous (flowers self-pollinate before they open).

The haploid chromosome number of E. nocturnum has been determined as n = 20.  The diploid chromosome number has been determined both as 2n = 40 and as 2n = 80.

In 1984, the variety E. nocturnum var. guadeloupense was determined to have a diploid chromosome number of 2n = 42—48.  On November 7, 2010, Kew did not recognize the existence of this variety in its World Checklist of Selected Plant Families.

References

External links 

nocturnum
Night-blooming plants
Flora of the Bahamas
Flora of the Caribbean
Garden plants of Central America
Garden plants of South America
Orchids of Central America
Orchids of Belize
Orchids of Brazil
Orchids of French Guiana
Orchids of Guyana
Orchids of Florida
Taxa named by Nikolaus Joseph von Jacquin
Flora without expected TNC conservation status